Norman Christie (1 September 1925 – 6 October 2010) was a Scottish football player and manager. He played for Third Lanark, Stirling Albion, Ayr United, Brechin City and Montrose. Christie retired in 1959 and was then soon appointed manager of Montrose, a position he held for ten years.

Honours
Montrose
Forfarshire Cup : 1960-61

References

External links
 
 Obituary in The Herald, 25 October 2010
 Time Tunnel - Norman Christie  (Montrose FC Online)

1925 births
2010 deaths
People from Ross and Cromarty
Scottish footballers
Third Lanark A.C. players
Stirling Albion F.C. players
Ayr United F.C. players
Brechin City F.C. players
Montrose F.C. players
Scottish Football League players
Scottish football managers
Montrose F.C. managers
Sportspeople from Highland (council area)
Association football central defenders